Scooby-Doo! Adventures: The Mystery Map is a direct-to-DVD puppet comedy mystery special, and is the twentieth installment in the Scooby-Doo direct-to-video series. It premiered on July 21, 2013, at San Diego Comic-Con, and was released on July 23, 2013, as a digital download and as a Walmart-exclusive DVD. It was released everywhere on DVD on February 11, 2014.

The puppets themselves are based on the main characters' designs from A Pup Named Scooby-Doo.

Plot
The Scooby Gang are hanging out in their tree house. Fred is lifting weights talking to himself in the mirror, Velma is using her computer, and Daphne is looking at her shoes and orders them to be lined up. Shaggy then orders a pizza, which is delivered instantly by Stu Stukowski. The gang denies eating the pizza when it arrives. Then Scooby finds a rolled up map in his slice of pizza. Velma discovers that the map is said to lead to the treasure of Gnarlybeard the Pirate. The gang sets out to find the treasure of Gnarlybeard the Pirate, only to be attacked by Phantom Parrot, who manages to swipe the map. Following the Phantom Parrot, they come across Dr. Escobar and Shirley – the latter Fred is smitten with. Thinking that the treasure is in the lighthouse, they manage to trap Phantom Parrot, finding out that it is Stu Stukowski. According to him, Gnarleybeard the Pirate is a distant relative of his, and the treasure is not discovered in the lighthouse.

However, back at the tree house, they discover that there is a piece missing from the map, which Scooby had eaten. The gang discovers that Gnarlybeard was Shirley in disguise, and Gnarlybeard's treasure was beard and hair care products. Shaggy and Scooby take advantage of this by occupying the bathroom and having fun with the products, while Fred, Daphne and Velma pound on the door.

Cast

Puppeteers
 David Rudman as Scooby-Doo
 Eric Jacobson as Shaggy Rogers
 Matt Vogel as Fred Jones
 Stephanie D'Abruzzo as Velma Dinkley, Shirley Stukowski
 Alice Dinnean as Daphne Blake, Dr. Escobar
 Peter Linz as Ye Phantom Parrot, Gnarlybeard, Stu Stukowski, Lighthouse Lou
 Paul McGinnis as Additional puppets
 Adam Rudman as Additional puppets

Voice cast
 Frank Welker as Fred Jones, Scooby-Doo
 Stephanie D'Abruzzo as Velma Dinkley, Shirley Stukowski
 Grey DeLisle Griffin as Daphne Blake, Dr. Escobar
 Matthew Lillard as Shaggy Rogers
 John Rhys-Davies as Gnarlybeard
 Dee Bradley Baker as Ye Phantom Parrot, Stu Stukowski
 Jeff Bennett as Lighthouse Lou, Hot Dog Vendor

Songs
 "Here Comes Summer" (Scooby-Doo! Camp Scare)
 "Dig It" (Scooby-Doo! Legend of the Phantosaur)
 "Scooby-Doo: Abracadabra Doo" (Scooby-Doo! Abracadabra-Doo)

See also
 A Pup Named Scooby-Doo

References

External links
 

Scooby-Doo specials
Direct-to-video specials
2013 direct-to-video films
2013 films
2010s English-language films
American children's animated adventure films
American children's animated comedy films
Warner Bros. direct-to-video animated films
Scooby-Doo direct-to-video animated films
Puppet films
Direct-to-video comedy films
2010s children's comedy films
2010s American animated films
2013 comedy films